Scindia is an important neighborhood situated on the coastal part of Visakhapatnam City, India. The area, which falls under the local administrative limits of Greater Visakhapatnam Municipal Corporation, it is one of the main industrial area in the city.

History
The name of this area came from Scindia Steam Navigation Company Ltd. which was established as shipyard in the year 1941 by Seth Walchand Hirachand. which changed the history of Visakhapatnam city industrial sector.

Transport
Scindia is well connected with Gajuwaka, Gopalapatnam, Pendurthi, Kurmannapalem and Kothavalasa. 55, 55K and 600 city bus routes are running from here.

APSRTC routes

References

Neighbourhoods in Visakhapatnam